Coldwater Spring (Dakota: Mní Ówe Sní) is a spring in the Fort Snelling unorganized territory of the U.S. state of Minnesota, that is considered a sacred site by the Dakota people, and was also the site of the U.S. Army's Camp Coldwater for troops that constructed Fort Snelling. Coldwater Spring is located on the west bluffs of the Mississippi River directly south of Minnehaha Park and adjacent to Fort Snelling State Park. Waters from the naturally occurring spring flow continuously year round and remain unfrozen in winter months. The spring and surrounding area is managed as a protected historic site and natural park by the National Park Service as part of the Mississippi National River and Recreation Area.

History

First people 
For hundreds of years, Dakota people have considered the spring and area around it to be a place of spiritual importance. The confluence of the Mississippi and Minnesota rivers was a neutral and sacred place where the Ojibwe, Dakota, Sauk and Fox (Mesquakie), and Potowatamie tribes moved freely.

Camp Coldwater 
The spring area was explored by early European-American settlers who were interested in expanding the fur trade. In September 1805, the area was part of a 100,000-acre (400 km2) land purchased from the Mdewakanton Sioux Indians by Zebulon Pike. The land was designated as a military reservation.

On May 5, 1820, Lieutenant Colonel Henry Leavenworth moved his troops to the spring area because their former encampment, on the Minnesota River, was causing unhealthy conditions. Leavenworth was succeeded by Colonel Josiah Snelling in August of that year. The soldiers lived in tents and huts on the site during three summers while they built the permanent stone fort south of the location, which was completed in 1825 and named Fort Snelling. The spring continued to supply water to the fort, first via water wagons and then via a stone water tower and underground pipes.

Settlers who had left the Red River Colony settled near the spring location in 1821, but were forced to leave in 1840.  They moved down the Mississippi River and settled in what eventually became Saint Paul, Minnesota. The Coldwater area once housed blacksmith shops, stables, trading posts, a hotel, and a steamboat landing, but nearly all of those buildings were gone by the time of the American Civil War.

With the re-opening of Fort Snelling during the Civil War, Coldwater Spring was once again used to supply water to the fort. In the 1880s, the Army built a formal waterworks at the site, including the extant springhouse and reservoir.

Mines research center 
Following the closing of Fort Snelling after World War II, the site was turned over to the United States Bureau of Mines as their Twin Cities Research Center, where mining research was carried out for over 40 years. Several buildings were constructed in the 1960s for over 200 workers. Researchers at the site were credited with developing an air filtration system to eliminate black lung disease among coal miners, and creating a beeping device to alert people when a heavy truck is backing up. The Twin Cities Research Center closed in 1996 and several buildings were left abandoned.

Highway construction 
For many years, efforts to protect the spring delayed planned freeway construction in the area. The Minnesota Department of Transportation set a national precedent in 2003 by welding 28,000 square yards of eight-layer synthetic liner, covering approximately six acres to protect the water flow to the spring. The liner isolated the interchange of Minnesota highways 55 and 62, allowing it to sit below the water table and remain dry, while also letting the water flow beneath the interchange to the spring.

Ownership transition 
The National Park Service led an environmental impact statement process in 2006 to consider potential future uses of the site that had been largely abandoned for the past ten years. If disposing of the site, the federal government was required by law to sell the land to a state or local government, American Indian tribe, or an academic institution. Some of the vacant mine research buildings may been have eligible for National Register for Historic Places status, but would have required expensive repairs. Hennepin County officials wanted to convert the site to a suburban business park. Conservationists argued that the spring area should be repurposed as a publicly accessible natural park.

Coldwater Spring park 
The property was transferred to the National Park Service in 2010, and made a unit of the Mississippi National River and Recreation Area. Plans to restore the native landscape led to discussion about Dakota history and ownership of the area. The community at the Lower Sioux Indian Reservation designated Coldwater as a traditional cultural property, making an official statement that the area "has been used for traditional, spiritual, religious and cultural ceremonies by the MN. Mdewakanton and their hereditary descendents [sic] for thousands of years" and that "the water of Coldwater Spring has been traditionally utilized for healing of Dakota people and others." The National Park Service held the view that while there were Dakota villages along the lower Minnesota River, there is little evidence the spring itself was a ceremonial site. 

National Park Service crews at Coldwater Spring repaired the springhouse structure, restored the creek and wetlands, removed invasive species like buckthorn, and removed several abandoned buildings. The result was a savanna landscape said to resemble pre-settlement by European-American people. The National Park Service opened Coldwater Spring park to the public in 2012.

Geology and hydrology 
Coldwater Spring emanates from Platteville limestone bedrock near the river gorge that was formed over 10,000 years ago by glacier melt at the end of the most recent ice age. Waters exit the spring into a reservoir before tumbling into a wetlands waterfall and eventually reaching the Mississippi River. Water from Coldwater Spring is not considered drinkable.

Landscape 
The site was extensively re-landscaped in 2012 with native grasses and wildflowers in an attempt to restore the original oak savanna landscape. Prairie restoration efforts had the similar aim as those at Bruce Vento Nature Sanctuary in Saint Paul a few years prior. Much of the restored landscape is maintained by NPS biological staff in partnership with biweekly volunteer crews.

Recreation 
The main features of Coldwater Spring park are walking paths through a tallgrass prairie, the naturally occurring spring, and the historic springhouse and reservoir. There is a  crushed limestone path from the entrance that winds through the restored savanna to the historic springhouse structure. Beyond the springhouse, a  hiking trail crosses the creek into the nearby woodlands and connects with the multi-use Minnehaha Trail, leading northward to Minnehaha Park or southward to Fort Snelling State Park. Bird watching and wildlife viewing are popular activities for visitors. The park has limited parking and there is no visitor's center or restroom facility.

Quotes

Gallery

References

External links 

 Coldwater Spring park map 

Bodies of water of Hennepin County, Minnesota
Former populated places in Minnesota
Former populated places in Hennepin County, Minnesota
History of Minneapolis
Mississippi National River and Recreation Area
Springs of Minnesota
Hiking trails in Minnesota
National Recreation Trails in Minnesota
Minneapolis–Saint Paul
Protected areas on the Mississippi River
National Park Service areas in Minnesota
National Park Service National Recreation Areas